Soorts-Hossegor is a commune in the Landes department in Nouvelle-Aquitaine in southwestern France, 20 km (12 miles) north of Biarritz.

It is a well known seaside resort that is renowned for its surfing. The city's economy is centered around surfing. Its inhabitants are called Hossegoriens.

Name 
In 1913, the town associated the toponym of Hossegor, from the name of its marine lake, with its original name of Soorts.

Related names are Sor (Ariège, Sort) and Sort-en-Chalosse (Landes) from the same Gascon etymon.

The origin of Hossegor is more obscure: it may be an Aquitain or Basque name to be attached to the hydronyms osse and the adjective gorri, meaning "dry water".

History
Hossegor became a seaside resort in the early twentieth century. It is located between the cities of Biarritz and Arcachon.

Initially, it attracted wealthy visitors from large cities like Paris.

Some noteworthy visitors to Soorts-Hossegor have included J.H. Rosny in 1903 and Paul Margueritte in 1909.

Other personalities later joined them, like Charles Derennes in 1913, then Maxime Leroy, Gaston Chérau, Pierre Benoit, Tristan Dereme and Leon Blum in 1920.

After the Second World War, the town attracted a wider selection of visitors, including industrialists, academics and doctors. From the 1920s, real estate programs increased the arrival of tourists in the resort.

Some architects of the time became famous and embarked on many architectural projects. For example, in the early 1930s, the Gomez brothers built the Place des Landais: it was the first development of the waterfront in the town. This seafront was unique at the time. Indeed, the two architects built villas "en bande" (in a row) in the néo-Basque architectural style.

Many hotels were built at that time, such as Les Hortensias du Lac, a four-star luxury hotel with an extraordinary view of the marine lake, and the Mercedes, a three-star hotel near the city center overlooking the canal.

The Sporting Casino was built in those years; it attracted an elegant and wealthy clientele. Today, it hosts various exhibitions and events. It has also become an influential sports complex with its swimming pool, tennis courts and a miniature golf course.

Since the late 1990s, ultra-modern villas have been built in the resort.

Privileged individuals build huge villas near the lake and golf course in the same architectural style.

Climate

Sports and events 
Municipal Stadium Soorts-Hossegor.

Every year, at the end of September, the greatest surfers of the world meet on the beaches of Hossegor to compete in a race counting for the pro world championships: the Quiksilver Pro France. The French Surf Federation has its headquarters in Hossegor. Surfing is a big attraction for visitors and a very important tourist activity for Hossegor.

It has long been one of the premier surfing locations in Europe, with a series of world-class beach breaks such as Gravière and La Nord, and with nearby beach breaks in Capbreton and Seignosse such as La Piste and Bourdaines.

In Hossegor there is also a large lake where many water activities can be enjoyed. The Landes forest is popular with nature lovers and cyclists.

Each summer the Grand Prix des Landes takes place on the Hossegor golf course. The Hossegor Golf Club is in the national league for both men's and women's golfers.

Golf is a popular activity in the Soorts-Hossegor region (and elsewhere on the Atlantic coast around Biarritz). Other sports available in the town are diving, tennis, horse riding and Basque pelote.

Another event takes place during Easter weekend: the sale of "spirit surf" clothes. More than 100,000 people flock to the craft zone where the European headquarters of brands such as Rip Curl and Billabong are located, looking to purchase sport clothes.

Population

In 2015, the town had 3823 inhabitants, an increase of 2.69% compared to 2010.

See also
Communes of the Landes department

References

 Sébastien Barrère, Petite histoire d'Hossegor, Éditions Cairn, 2015, 156 p.

External links
 Official website
 Website about Hossegor
 Practical information
 Practical information about surf conditions and surfing in Hossegor

Communes of Landes (department)
Landes communes articles needing translation from French Wikipedia